Chavín de Huántar District is one of sixteen districts of the Huari Province in Peru.

Geography 
The Cordillera Blanca traverses the western part of the district. Some of the highest peaks of the district are listed below:

Ethnic groups 
The people in the district are mainly indigenous citizens of Quechua descent. Quechua is the language which the majority of the population (82.85%) learnt to speak in childhood, 16.71% of the residents started speaking using the Spanish language (2007 Peru Census).

See also 
 Allpaqucha
 Yanaqucha

References

Districts of the Huari Province
Districts of the Ancash Region